Hưng Phú may refer to several places in Vietnam, including:

Hưng Phú, Cần Thơ, a ward of Cái Răng District
Hưng Phú, Nghệ An, a commune of Hưng Nguyên District
Hưng Phú, Sóc Trăng, a commune of Mỹ Tú District
Hưng Phú, Bạc Liêu, a commune of Phước Long District